Mondawmin refers to the following in Baltimore, Maryland, in the United States:

Mondawmin, Baltimore, a neighborhood in Northwest Baltimore
Mondawmin Mall, a three-story mall located in the Mondawmin neighborhood
Mondawmin station, a Baltimore Metro subway station located at Mondawmin Mall
Mondawmin Shuttle Bug, also known as MTA bus route 82, a transit route operated in Baltimore